In the NUTS (Nomenclature of Territorial Units for Statistics) codes of Finland (FI), the three levels are:

NUTS codes
2013 version.

In the 2003 version, Satakunta was coded FI191, and Pirkanmaa was coded FI192.

Local administrative units

Below the NUTS levels, the two LAU (Local Administrative Units) levels are:

The LAU codes of Finland can be downloaded here:

See also
List of Finnish regions by Human Development Index
Subdivisions of Finland
 ISO 3166-2 codes of Finland
 FIPS region codes of Finland

Sources
 Hierarchical list of the Nomenclature of territorial units for statistics - NUTS and the Statistical regions of Europe
 Overview map of EU Countries - NUTS level 1
 SUOMI / FINLAND - NUTS level 2
 SUOMI / FINLAND - NUTS level 3
 Correspondence between the NUTS levels and the national administrative units
 List of current NUTS codes
 Download current NUTS codes (ODS format)
 Provinces of Finland, Statoids.com

References

Finland
Nuts